Swiss is a populated place in Yancey County, North Carolina, United States.

References

Populated places in Yancey County, North Carolina